Psilorhynchus pavimentatus is a freshwater ray-finned fish, from the headwaters of Ann Chaung drainage in Myanmar.

References

pavimentatus
Fish of Asia
Fish of Myanmar
Taxa named by Kevin W. Conway
Taxa named by Maurice Kottelat
Fish described in 2010